The Boardman–Mitchell House is a three-story, six-bedroom Italianate villa located at 710 Bay Street, Staten Island, New York.   It also has the address of 33 Brownell Street since it connects to both streets.   It is a New York City Landmark and was listed on the National Register of Historic Places in 2012.  It is known as a good example of a suburban architectural style used in an urban setting, as well as its connection to the piloting history of that portion of Staten Island.

History
The house was built by Dr. James Boardman of the Seaman's Retreat hospital.  His widow sold it to Captain Elvin Eugene Mitchell, a founder of the Sandy Hook Pilots Benevolent Association and known for his dramatic rescue of 176 people from the SS Oregon sinking in 1886.  It remained in the Mitchell family until 1968 and has been sold several times since.  In 2009, it was given to Barnett Shepherd, a local preservationist who started restoring the building.

See also
List of New York City Designated Landmarks in Staten Island
National Register of Historic Places listings in Richmond County, New York

References

External links
Video description of house restoration

Houses on the National Register of Historic Places in Staten Island
Italianate architecture in New York (state)
Houses completed in 1848
New York City Designated Landmarks in Staten Island